It's About Time is the first CD digital format album release by the California State University, Los Angeles Jazz Ensembles completed in 1990.   In addition to two big bands (1989/1990) the CD features the CSULA Jazz Sextet.   The jazz bands had numerous student musicians that have made a name for themselves as professionals to include Luis Bonilla, Jack Cooper, Corey Gemme, Alan Parr, Randall Willis, Paul De Castro, Alex Henderson, Sheffer Bruton, Ruben Ramos, and José Arellano.

Background 
In 1984 and 1985, the California State University, Los Angeles Music Department and CSULA Associated Students decided to fund LP recordings of the jazz ensemble to better serve as a teaching tool for student music, jazz groups.   It's About Times is the fifth of six albums to come from CSULA during the 1980s featuring the award winning CSULA #1 Jazz Ensemble.  The CD contains tracks from the #1 CSULA Jazz Ensembles of two successive years and a sextet to include compositions of five students and from the two directors (professors David Caffey and Jeff Benedict).   
 
There has been a consistent tradition of musicians coming from the CSULA program who have worked with major musical acts, on major studio and movie projects, and hold positions in higher education in music.   The roster on this album is self-evident as to the diversity and level of student musicians CSULA developed at that time and has for many years dating far back to musicians (graduates) such as Lennie Niehaus and Gabe Baltazar.

Track listing

Recording Sessions 
 Recorded: May 11, 1989  Group IV Recording, Los Angeles, California
 Recorded: May 5 and 6, 1990 Sage and Sound Recording, Hollywood, California
 Mixing: May 25 and June 1, 1990 Sage and Sound Recording, Hollywood, California

Personnel

Musicians 
Conductor: David Caffey and Jeff Benedict
Saxes and woodwinds: Jack Cooper, David Quillen, Randall Willis, Victor Cisneros, Brian McFaddin, Erick Clements, Luis Segovia
Trumpets and flugelhorns: Alan Parr, Howard Choy, Corey Gemme, Jim Bynum, Steve Sotomoyor, Bub Gordon, Mike Collins
Trombones: Gary Smith, Luis Bonilla, José Arellano, Alex Henderson, Brian Money, Gabino Varela, Sheffer Bruton
Guitar: Andre Bush
Piano: Paul De Castro, Richard Kahn
Vibraphone and marimba: Cory Estrada
Bass: Ruben Ramos
Drums: Marc Guité
Percussion: Mike Erpino

Production 
Recording engineers (Group IV Recording): George Belle
Recording engineers (Sage & Sound): Jim Mooney and Jerry Wood
Mixing engineers: George Belle (1989)
Mixing engineers: Jim Mooney and David Caffey (1990)
Mastering: CMS Digital, Robert Vosgien
Cover photo: Greg Parks

References

External links

1990 albums
California State University, Los Angeles Jazz Ensemble albums
Big band albums